Robert Bagley is a professor of Chinese art history and archaeology in the Department of Art and Archaeology at Princeton University.

Career 
Bagley specialises in pre-Han art and archaeology with other academic interests, including ornament, archaeometallurgy and ancient metal technology, archaic Chinese jades, comparative study of the first civilizations and the first writing systems, and the archaeology of ancient Chinese music.

Education 
A.B. (1967), A.M. (1973), Ph.D. (1981), Harvard University.

M.S. (1969), University of Chicago.

Selected publications 
Max Loehr and the Study of Chinese Bronzes: Style and Classification in the History of Art. Ithaca, NY: Cornell East Asia Series, 2008.
“Anyang Writing and the Origin of the Chinese Writing System.” Chapter 7 (pp. 190–249) in Stephen D. Houston, ed., The First Writing. Cambridge: Cambridge University Press, 2004.
 
Shang Archaeology.” Chapter 3 (pp. 124–231) in Michael Loewe and Edward L. Shaughnessy, eds., The Cambridge History of Ancient China. Cambridge: Cambridge University Press, 1999.
“Les techniques métallurgiques” (pp. 37–44) and “Les vases rituels au début de l’âge du bronze” (pp. 57–64) in Rites et festins de la Chine antique: Bronzes du musée de Shanghai. Paris: Musée Cernuschi, 1998.
Shang Ritual Bronzes in the Arthur M. Sackler Collections. Cambridge MA: Harvard University Press, 1987.

References

American art historians
Living people
Princeton University faculty
Harvard University alumni
American sinologists
University of Chicago alumni
Year of birth missing (living people)